The highest temperature recorded on Earth has been measured in three major ways: air, ground, and via satellite observation. Air measurements are used as the standard measurement due to persistent issues with unreliable ground and satellite readings. Air measurements are noted by the World Meteorological Organization (WMO) and Guinness World Records among others as the standard to be used for determining the official record. For ninety years, a former record that was measured in Libya had been in place, until it was decertified in 2012 based on evidence that it was an erroneous reading. This finding has since raised questions about the legitimacy of the 1913 record measured in Death Valley, with several meteorological experts asserting that there were similar irregularities. The WMO has stood by the record as official pending any future investigative results.

Several unverified temperatures of all three readings have also been recorded that exceed the current record holder. These include historical claims that were never authenticated due to the equipment available at the time and unverified scientific claims. There are also disproven amateur readings that have been posted on social media showing evidence of extreme temperature.

History
 

Global surface temperatures as a whole have been monitored since the 1880s when record keeping began. Ninety years later, this record was decertified, making the former reading in Death Valley the world's highest official temperature again. The decertification of the former record in Libya has since cast doubt on the validity of the 1913 recording. If the 1913 record were to be decertified, the highest established recorded air temperature on Earth would be , also recorded in Death Valley on 20 June 2013, and in Mitribah, Kuwait on 21 July 2016.

Measurements have also been taken in two other ways via ground and satellite readings. Temperature measurements via satellite also tend to capture the occurrence of higher records but, due to complications involving the satellite's altitude loss (a side effect of atmospheric friction), these measurements are often considered less reliable than ground-positioned thermometers. The Lut Desert was also found to have the highest maximum temperature in 5 of the 7 years measured (2004, 2005, 2006, 2007, and 2009). These measurements reflect averages over a large region and so are lower than the maximum point surface temperature.

Issues
In the early 21st century, prior recordings for the highest temperature on Earth were investigated as probable misreadings. This record was decertified by the WMO in January 2012 as persuasive evidence led to a faulty reading recorded in error by an inexperienced observer. The decertification of this former record led researchers to also investigate the former and current recordings made in Death Valley in 1913. One of the earliest objections came in 1949 by Dr. Arnold Court, who concluded that the temperature may have been the result of a sandstorm that occurred at the time. Court stated that "such a storm may have caused superheated surface materials to hit upon the temperature in the shelter." Modern weather historians such as Christopher C. Burt and William Taylor Reid have also claimed that the 1913 Death Valley reading is "a myth", and is at least  too high. The WMO has come out in support of the current record stating that "We accept that Death Valley temperature extreme record. If any new materials on it surface, we will be prepared to open an investigation, but at this time all available evidence points to its legitimacy."

Unverified claims   
These include historical claims that were never authenticated due to the equipment available at the time and unverified scientific claims. Amateur readings have also been done through social media that claimed extreme temperatures which were later discredited. Videos were posted in one instance that allegedly showed street lights melting or trees bursting into flames. These were later disproven by meteorologists who tied the "evidence" to other unrelated prior events that had taken place. All of the recordings listed before 1972 were allegedly caused by a sudden localized increase in air temperature near the surface, known as a heat burst.

See also
Desert climate
Heat wave
Highest temperatures ever recorded
Lowest temperature recorded on Earth
Lowest temperatures ever recorded
Orders of magnitude (temperature)

References

Temperature
Weather extremes of Earth
 Climate and weather statistics